The OFC Olympic Qualifying Tournament is a tournament held once in four years' time to decide the only qualification spot for Oceania Football Confederation (OFC) and representatives at the Olympic Games. Unlike other continent, winner of OFC Olympic Qualifying Tournament does not giving away any trophy.

Eligible teams
Fourteen nations are eligible to participate in the tournament, these are:

 (not a member of FIFA)

 (French Polynesia)

 (not a member of FIFA)

Previous tournaments

Note: The 2015 Olympic qualifying tournament was held as part of the men's football tournament at the 2015 Pacific Games.

References

External links
OFC Official Website

 
Oceania Football Confederation competitions
Football qualification for the Summer Olympics